Julen Cordero González (born 1 July 2001) is a Costa Rican professional footballer who currently plays as a midfielder for Saprissa.

Career statistics

Club

Notes

References

2001 births
Living people
Costa Rican footballers
Association football midfielders
Deportivo Saprissa players
Le Havre AC players
Liga FPD players
Championnat National 3 players
Costa Rican expatriate footballers
Costa Rican expatriate sportspeople in France
Expatriate footballers in France